The Hers-Vif ("Live Hers", as opposed to the slower flowing Hers-Mort, "Dead Hers"), also named Grand Hers or simply Hers, is a  long river in southern France, right tributary of the Ariège.

It flows some  through the Pyrenees, descending  to the village of Peyrat, where it reaches a piedmont plain.  Its valley widens as it traverses the plain, reaching the medieval city of Mirepoix, which marks the start of its lower valley.

Several rivers flow into it:
From the Pyrenees: the Lasset; the Fontaine de Fontestorbes; the Touyre
From the piedmont plain and hills: the Blau and the Douctouyre;
From the hills of Lauragais and Razès: the Ambronne and the Vixiège.

Departments and towns along its course are:
Ariège: Prades, Bélesta, La Bastide-sur-l'Hers, Mirepoix, Mazères
Aude: Comus, Chalabre
Haute-Garonne: Calmont

Floods

The Hers is probably known as vif (intense or rapid in this context) because of its sometimes spectacular floods – that of 16 June 1289 having entirely destroyed Mirepoix.  More recently, there have been:

References

Rivers of France
Rivers of Ariège (department)
Rivers of Aude
Rivers of Haute-Garonne
Rivers of Occitania (administrative region)